The Ultimate Chopper was a kitchen appliance, mainly advertised on television in the form of an As Seen On TV 30 minute infomercial, and sold on-line.

What it does
The Ultimate Chopper is mainly used for chopping and preparing food in preparation of cooking. It is also used for mixing and whipping.

What comes in the package
The Ultimate Chopper comes with the following items :

 Power Base (600 watt motor, 750 watts peak power)
 Plastic blade assembly with two "German stainless steel" blades
 Chopping Cup (white plastic cup where the blades and the food ingredients set in)
 Clear interlocking lid (to prevent ingredients from splattering in the air, and to prevent the machine from running unless the lid is properly locked into place)

Optional accessories
The Ultimate Chopper also has an optional accessory called the Ultimate Blender. The Ultimate Blender accessory is placed on the Ultimate Chopper's power base and can be used like any other blender.

Bonus items
When advertised on television, people who order the Ultimate Chopper receive a manual juice extractor for free. For the second version of the infomercial, a Miracle Blade III all-purpose knife was also included for free.

Infomercial hosts
 The first Ultimate Chopper infomercial featured an Austrian man named Horst Fuchs as the product demonstrator and Stuart Pankin as the co-host. Since Fuchs was German and since the chopping blades were made from "German stainless steel", Fuchs claimed that using the Ultimate Chopper was as easy as "Eins, zwei, drei" (German for "one, two, three")and encouraged the studio audience to count "Eins, zwei, drei" along with  him. Neither the Ultimate Blender accessory nor the Miracle Blade III "all-purpose slicer" knife were mentioned in this version. Also included the "Perfect Juicer" manual juice extractor. Aired 2002-2003.
 The second Ultimate Chopper infomercial was much in the same style as the first one, however Tony Notaro, aka "Chef Tony", now serves as the product demonstrator, and Pankin is replaced by Jenilee Harrison as the co-host. The Ultimate Blender accessory is mentioned, shown, and demonstrated in this version. In addition, this version also included a free Miracle Blade III "all-purpose slicer" knife. Also included the "Perfect Juicer" manual juice extractor. Has aired on television since 2003. In this infomercial, Chef Tony demonstrated the power of the Ultimate Chopper by chopping concrete into powder, however Tony said he was only doing it to prove a point.

Safety recall
In 2005, a recall was announced for the Ultimate Chopper due to a malfunction in the interlocking lid assembly, which would allow the machine to run without having the lid properly in place, putting users of the product at risk of lacerations and/or fingertip amputation if consumers insert their hands into the food processor. 17 consumers issued safety complaints with the U.S. Consumer Product Safety Commission. Five of the complainants required stitches or surgery, and the other 12 received cuts or scratches.

Discontinuation
According to the CSPC's product recall page for the Ultimate Chopper, the Ultimate Chopper was sold from March 2002 through July 2005. However, infomercials still show up on television, most likely in an attempt to sell all remaining stock as the price has been discounted from its original $59.90 (two payments of $29.95) to $39.95.

References

External links
Ultimate Chopper website (from the Internet Archive Wayback Machine)

See also
Chef Tony
Jenilee Harrison

Home appliance brands